Kujanpää is  a surname. Notable people with the surname include:

Aatu Kujanpää (born 1998), Finnish footballer
Eino Kujanpää (1904–1980), Finnish construction worker and politician
Jarmo Kujanpää (born 1959), Finnish footballer

Finnish-language surnames